The Tonto Group is a name for an assemblage of related sedimentary strata, collectively known by geologists as a Group, that comprises the basal sequence Paleozoic strata exposed in the sides of the Grand Canyon. As currently defined, the Tonto groups consists of the Sixtymile Formation, Tapeats Sandstone, Bright Angel Shale (or Formation), Muav Limestone (or Formation), and Frenchman Mountain Dolostone. Historically, it included only the Tapeats Sandstone, Bright Angel Shale, and Muav Limestone. Because these units are defined by lithology and three of them interfinger and intergrade laterally, they lack the simple layer cake geology as they are typically portrayed as having and geological mapping of them is complicated.

Nomenclature 
In 1874 and 1875, S. K. Gilbert named the Tonto Group. Although it was mentioned that it outcropped in the Tonto Basin and the headwaters of Tonto Creek of south-central Arizona, he did not indicate which of these landforms, for which this group is named. Although the word tonto is silly or foolish in Spanish, this place name for either Tonto Basin or Tonto Creek is derived from the Apache word, Koun’nde. This word means wild, rough people and refers to the indigenous Dilzhe’e Tonto Apache. From the area of the Tonto Basin, Gilbert also recognized that similar rocks are exposed near the bottom of the Grand Canyon. From youngest to oldest, Gilbert subdivided the Tonto Group into the Marbled limestone (now subdivided into the Muav Limestone and Frenchman Dolostone); the Tonto shale (now the Bright Angel Shale); the Tonto sandstone (now the Tapeats Sandstone). However, he did not specify a specific type locality. Decades later, R. C. Rose proposed an exposure in Backtail Canyon for a type locality.

In 1914, L F. Noble officially redefined and renamed the formations comprising the Tonto Group. The Tonto Sandstone was renamed the Tapeats Sandstone and the Tonto Shale was renamed the Bright Angel Shale. The Marbled limestone was renamed the Muav Limestone, which by Noble's definition consisted of an upper set of dolomite beds and a lower set of limestone beds.

Later in 1945, E. D. McKee and C. E. Resser subdivided the formations into a number of members in their recognition of the laterally gradation, time transgressive, and interfingering nature of the formations comprising the Tonto Group. In addition, they subdivided the Muav Limestone of Noble into undifferentiated dolomites, overlying an Muav Limestone composed entirely of the lower limestone strata. Furthermore, they removed the undifferentiated dolomites from the Tonto Group. Recently, the undifferentiated dolomites, now known as the Frenchman Mountain Dolostone, have been restore as a formation within the Tonto Group. In addition, along with the Frenchman Mountain Dolostone, the Sixtymile Formation is regarded to be part of the Tonto Group

The horizontal Tonto Group units lie upon the Vishnu Basement Rocks above an angular unconformity as the Vishnu Basement Rocks have a dip of about 15 degrees. This erosion unconformity prior to the deposition of the Tapeats Sandstone upon the tilted Vishnu Basement Rocks is about 1,000 million years (1.0 billion years), and is called the Great Unconformity.

Description
As currently defined Tonto Group consists of the Sixtymile Formation, Tapeats Sandstone, Bright Angel Shale, Muav Limestone, and Frenchman Mountain Dolostone.

The Sixtymile Formation is a very thin accumulation of sandstone, siltstone, and breccia underlying the Tapeats Sandstone. It is exposed only atop Nankoweap Butte and within Awatubi and Sixtymile Canyons in the eastern Grand Canyon, Arizona. Sixtymile Formation is preserved only in a broad asymmetric fold, called the Chuar syncline. The actual depositional thickness of the Sixtymile Formation is unknown owing to erosion prior to deposition of the Tapeats Sandstone. The Sixtymile Formation uncomformably overlies the Cnur Group. Fossils have been reported from the Sixtymile Formation.

In the Grand Canyon, the Tapeats Sandstone is a medium- to coarse-grained, thin-bedded, cliff-forming conglomeratic sandstone that weathers to a tan or reddish-brown. Typically, fine sandstone becomes common towards the top in its upper , which is part of a transition zone between it and the overlying Bright Angel Shale. The basal part of the Tapeats Sandstone is locally conglomeratic with beds of mudstone. Except where it overlies the Sixtymile Formation, the base of the Tapeats Sandstone is an unconformity underlying Precambrian rocks and is known as the Great Unconformity. In the eastern Grand Canyon, the Tapeats Sandstone uncomfortably overlies a hilly and weathered paleosurface underlain by the Grand Canyon Group and, in one structural basin, the Cambrian Sixtymile Formation. In the western Grand Canyon, the Tapeats Sandstone uncomfortably overlies a hilly and weathered paleosurface underlain by the Vishnu Basement Rocks The Tapeats Sandstone contains the fossils of brachiopods, trilobites, and invertebrate burrows and trails.

The Bright Angel Shale consists of  green and red-brown, micaceous, thin-bedded shale, siltstone, and sandstone that weathers to a slope of the same colors. It is mostly composed of fissile shale (mudstone) and siltstone with some thicker beds of brown to tan sandstones and dolostones all of which are sometimes divided into numerous members. The thin-bedded shales and sandstones are often interbedded in cm-scale cycles. Sedimentary structures are abundant in the Bright Angel Shale and include current, oscillation, and interference ripples. The Bright Angel Shale has a complex gradational and interfingering relationship with the overlying Muav Limestone and underlying Tapeats Sandstone. The Bright Angel Shale is the most fossiliferous of the formations of the Tonto Group. It has yielded majority of the body fossils known from the Tonto Group and is particularly rich in ichnofossils. As a whole, trilobite and other body fossils are fragmentary and rare in Bright Angel Shale. However, individual fossil quarries in the Bright Angel Shale, when excavated, are just as productive as many other Cambrian formations in the Great Basin and Rocky Mountain regions. Finally, possible bryophyte-grade cryptospores have been recovered from the Bright Angel Shale.

The Muav Limestone consists of  thin-bedded, gray, medium to fine-grained, mottled dolomite; coarse- to medium-grained, grayish-white, sandy dolomite; and fine-grained limestone. It also contains thin beds of thin shale (mudstone) and siltstone, and conglomerate. The Muav Limestone weathers to a dark gray or rusty-orange color and forms cliffs or small ledges. Its upper contact is a disconformity with the overlying Frenchman Mountain Dolostone. It contains a wide variety of body fossils including sponges, brachiopods, hyoliths, helcionelloids, trilobites, eocrinoids, and enigmatic invertebrates (Chancelloria, Scenella). Trilobites found in the Muav Limestone are of the same age as trilobites found in the Bright Angel Shale of eastern Grand canyon region, so it is likely not substantially younger. The trace fossils found in the Muav Limestone consist of invertebrate burrows and trails and Girvanella-like structures (oncolites).

The Frenchman Mountain Dolostone consists of white to dark gray, thin- to medium-bedded dolomite, which is separated by the underlying Muav Limestone by a disconformity throughout the Grand Canyon region. Its lower part contains shale partings that separate individual dolomite beds. The Frenchman Mountain Dolostone forms a series of ledges, cliffs, and slopes. The only known fossils reported from the Frenchman Mountain Dolostone are invertebrate burrows and trails.

Tonto Platform
The Tonto Platform is a very prominent, wide bench that occurs near the bottom of the eastern Grand Canyon. The gentle slopes of the Tonto Platform were created by rapid backwearing of the Bright Angle Shale. Along its lower edge, the erosion resistant Tapeats Sandstone forms a cliff that marks the outer boundary of the Inner Gorge and the lower boundary of the Outer Canyon. Forming the upper edge of the Tonto Platform are alternating cliffs and steep slopes formed by Cambrian limestones and dolomites. The Tonto Trail is a mostly horizontal trail on the south side of Granite Gorge that lies upon the Tonto Platform.

See also

 Geology of the Grand Canyon area
 Great Unconformity
 Sauk sequence

References

External links 
 Mathis, A., and C. Bowman (2007) The Grand Age of Rocks: The Numeric Ages for Rocks Exposed within Grand Canyon, Grand Canyon National Park, Arizona, National Park Service, Grand Canyon National Park, Arizona.
 Rowland, S. (nda) Frenchman Mountain Great Unconformity site. Department of Geoscience, University of Nevada, Las Vegas, Nevada.
 Share, J.  (2102a) The Great Unconformity of the Grand Canyon and the Late Proterozoic-Cambrian Time Interval: Part I – Defining It.
 Share, J.  (2102a) The Great Unconformity and the Late Proterozoic-Cambrian Time Interval: Part II – The Rifting of Rodinia and the "Snowball Earth" Glaciations That Followed.
 Timmons, M. K. Karlstrom, and C. Dehler (1999) Grand Canyon Supergroup Six Unconformities Make One Great Unconformity A Record of Supercontinent Assembly and Disassembly. Boatman's Quarterly Review. vol. 12, no. 1, pp. 29–32.
 Timmons, S. S. (2003) Learning to Read the Pages of a Book (Grand Canyon Geology Training Manual), National Park Service, Grand Canyon National Park, Arizona.

Grand Canyon
Geologic groups of Arizona
Geologic groups of Nevada
Natural history of the Grand Canyon
Cambrian Arizona
Cambrian Nevada
Cambrian System of North America